The Adventures of Leonidas Witherall was a radio mystery series broadcast on Mutual in the mid-1940s.

Based on the novels of Phoebe Atwood Taylor (writing as Alice Tilton), the 30-minute dramas were produced by Roger Bower and starred Walter Hampden as Leonidas Witherall, a New England boys' school instructor in Dalton, Massachusetts, a fictional Boston suburb. Witherall, who resembled William Shakespeare, is an amateur detective and the accomplished author of the "popular Lieutenant Hazeltine stories."

His housekeeper Mrs. Mollett, who in the novels is constantly offering her "candied opinion", was played first by Ethel Remey and then Agnes Moorehead, and Jack MacBryde appeared as Police Sgt. McCloud. The announcer was Carl Caruso. Milton Kane supplied the music. The series began June 4, 1944 and continued until May 6, 1945.

Listen to
http://oldtimeradiolover.com/the-adventures-of-leonidas-witherall/

References

External links
Jerry Haendiges Vintage Radio Logs: The Adventures of Leonidas Witherall

Adventures of Leonidas Witherall, The
Adventures of Leonidas Witherall, The
Mutual Broadcasting System programs